Mário João Carlos do Rosário de Brito Miranda  (2 May 1926 – 11 December 2011), popularly known as Mario Miranda or Mario de Miranda, was an Indian cartoonist and painter based in Loutolim in the Indian state of Goa.

Miranda had been a regular with The Times of India and other newspapers in Mumbai, including The Economic Times, though he got his popularity with his works published in The Illustrated Weekly of India. He was awarded India's second highest civilian award, the Padma Vibhushan (posthumously) in 2012.

Life and career

Early life
Miranda was born in Daman, then in Portuguese India, to Catholic parents of Brahmin origin and his family surname is Sardesai. At an early age, he would draw caricatures and sketch on the walls of his home, until his mother brought him a blank book. He then began making personalised postcards for his friends, charging them a token amount, in the 1930s and 1940s. He even started getting into trouble at school, for sketching Catholic priests. Mario Miranda's early cartoons presented vignettes of Goan village life, a theme he is best known for even today. He would maintain diaries from the age of 10, sketching the life around him.

He studied at St. Joseph's Boys' High School, Bangalore and then did a B.A. in history at St. Xavier's College, Mumbai, while focusing on the Indian Administrative Service (IAS). Thereafter he started studying architecture at the behest of his parents, though he soon lost interest. He then began getting small commissions and would sketch people in his private diaries in 1949. He loved good food and red wine in moderation but would mainly visit eateries and taverns to document the lives of the patrons.

Career beginnings
Miranda started his career in an advertising studio, where he worked for four years, before taking up cartooning full-time. He got his first break as a cartoonist with The Illustrated Weekly of India which published a few of his works. His drawings & cartoons also brought him an offer to work at the Current magazine. A year later, the Times of India offered him a slot, even though they had rejected him at first. Thereafter, his creations, such as Miss Nimbupani and Miss Fonseca, appeared on a regular basis in Femina, Economic Times, and The Illustrated Weekly of India.

Mario then won a grant by the Calouste Gulbenkian Foundation and lived in Portugal for year, helping him "broaden his horizons". He then moved to London, working for different newspapers and even working in television animation. During his five years spent there, his caricatures were published in magazines like Mad, Lilliput and Punch. He then travelled to many countries, either working or conducting exhibitions.

Return to Mumbai
Miranda returned to India for good in the late 1980s and was offered back his old job with the Times of India in Mumbai, where he worked with noted cartoonist, R.K. Laxman.

Thereafter, Miranda met artist Habiba Hydari.  Habiba was part of Hyderabad based Hydari family and grand-daughter of Akbar Hydari. They got married and had two sons, Rahul and Rishad.

Recognition and fame
Miranda's big break came in 1974, when, at the invitation of the United States Information Services, he travelled to America, which enabled him to promote his art and interact with other cartoonists in the United States and also got a chance to work with Charles M. Schulz, the creator of Peanuts) and met Herblock, the editorial cartoonist of the Washington Post.

He held solo exhibitions in over 22 countries, including the United States, Japan, Brazil, Australia, Singapore, France, Yugoslavia, and Portugal.

Later years and death
After retirement, Miranda lived in his ancestral home, at Loutolim, a village in Salcete, Goa, with his wife Habiba. Even after he retired, Miranda's work was seen regularly in Mumbai publications, and he was invited to travel to countries such as Mauritius and Spain, and draw their local cultures. On 11 December 2011, Miranda died of natural causes at his home in Loutolim. Mario's body was then taken to the Hindu Crematorium in Margão, where he was cremated by his younger son Rishaad according to Hindu rites as per his wishes.

Indian cartoonist Graphi and fine artist, Vijay N Seth (Vins) paid tribute to Miranda, whom he considered as a mentor:

Style

According to Aaron Renier (who created the Google Doodle commemorating Miranda on his 90th birth anniversary in 2016), Miranda's most popular style of cartooning was "very flat with criss-crossing interactions". Renier went on to explain:

Miranda's cartoons often indulged in sexist stereotypes, with the women being drawn as curvaceous and having bulging eyes. He would observe people everywhere (like eateries, taverns, weddings, the bus stop, the post office) and document their social life. However, he always stayed away from drawing political cartoons.

Art critic Uma Nair describes how all his work was subtly witty. Describing his drawing style, she finds that his tales were told through cubism and the nature of the contours of his work, stating that his "geometric jiggles" coupled with subtle colours helped convey the emotions of the characters. His works would include people from all walks of life interacting with one another. Additionally, he would capture the essence of Goan life. She goes on to describe:

Beyond cartooning
Besides cartooning, Miranda's murals are present on various buildings in Goa and other parts of India. Late in life he took to paintings which received wide response.

Over the years, he published several books, including Laugh it Off, Goa with Love, and Germany in Wintertime.

Besides his own books, he illustrated books by Dom Moraes (A Journey to Goa), Manohar Malgonkar (Inside Goa) and Mario Cabral e Sá (Legends of Goa). He also illustrated many children's books, including Dul-Dul, The Magic Clay Horse (1968), The Adventures of Pilla the Pup (1969), and Lumbdoom, The Long-Tailed Langoor (1968), all written by Uma Anand and published by India Book House, Mumbai, under its Echo imprint.

In 1951, he collaborated with Sanskrit scholar Jose Pereira and IAS officer Alban Couto (Maria Aurora Couto's husband) to publish a special issue of Marg on Goan art and culture.

He loved to travel and listening to music and it was his ambition to experiment further with water colours and to write memories of his early years in Goa, on retirement. He was not able to fulfil these two latter ambitions.

In the 1990s, Rushi Yazdegardi (then owner) of Café Mondegar asked Mario Miranda to draw murals (cartoons) on two opposite walls. Both walls have different themes. Whilst one wall is dedicated to the Life in Mumbai, the other wall is dedicated to Atmosphere in the Café.

When the new municipal market of Panjim was inaugurated in 2004, Miranda was invited to paint a mural on its walls by then Chief Minister Manohar Parrikar. Delighted with how the new complex had turned out, he refused to charge fees from the government for his work.

Legacy
Miranda's house features in the 1985 Shyam Benegal film, Trikaal, which is loosely based on Miranda's family. Benegal admitted to having been deeply influenced by Miranda's house and family after a visit. He recalls how during his visit, he was told of how one of Miranda's ancestors accidentally killed the wrong Rane during the revolt of the Ranes in Goa, a story which inspired him to make the film.

In 2005, Gerard da Cunha began working on a book on the artist and collected 13,000 of Miranda's works, tracking them down through various sources. In 2016, an exhibition titled "A pocketful of chuckles" on the works of Mário de Miranda was held at Gallery Gitanjali at Panaji. This was the largest exhibition of the original cartoons and paintings of Mario de Miranda. The Life of Mario: 1949, a compilation of caricatures drawn by the 23-year old Mario Miranda in 1949, was also released by da Cunha. This was the third in a series that includes the years 1950 and 1951.

Awards and accolades
In 1988, Miranda was featured in the national integration "Mile Sur Mera Tumhara" video, which included multiple notable Indians in arts, films, literature, music, and sports. He was awarded the Padma Shri in 1988, the Padma Bhushan in 2002 and All India Cartoonists's Association, Bangalore, honoured him with a lifetime achievement award. The King of Spain, Juan Carlos, conferred on Mario the highest civilian honour of "Cross of the Order of Isabel the Catholic" which was presented to him on 11 November 2009 at his family home in Loutulim by tourism counsellor Don Miguel Nieto Sandoval. On 29 December 2009 Portugal, under the President of the Republic Aníbal Cavaco Silva, made him "Commander of the Order of Prince Henry", a Portuguese National Order of knighthood. Mario Miranda was posthumously awarded the Padma Vibhushan, India's second highest civilian award, by the President of India on 4 April 2012.

After his death in 2011, the Goa Legislative Assembly made an obituary reference to him in March 2012. In 2013, a road junction in Mumbai was named after Miranda. In May 2016, Google honoured him with a doodle on his 90th birth anniversary. The doodle showcased a typical Mumbai neighbourhood scene during the rains.

References

External links

 
 Documentary by DD Goa on YouTube
 Mario's cartoons from Goa with Love on Rediff (1999)
 Conversation series about life and work on YouTube: Part-1 & Part-2
 Interview with Karan Thapar for the BBC show Face to Face on YouTube

1926 births
2011 deaths
Indian cartoonists
Recipients of the Padma Vibhushan in arts
Recipients of the Padma Bhushan in literature & education
Recipients of the Padma Shri in literature & education
Commanders of the Order of Prince Henry
Journalists from Goa
20th-century Indian journalists
Indian Roman Catholics
The Times of India journalists
People from Daman district, India
Indian male journalists
20th-century Indian painters
Indian people of Portuguese descent